Chesworth House is a former Tudor manor house, located a mile south of Horsham, West Sussex, England.

The original Manor house became a farmhouse and has been extended several times. Part of the building is constructed of brick-clad timber framing, part of brick and part of stone rubble. It is a Grade II* listed building, so designated on account of its architectural interest and its historical association
with three queens of England.

History
The manor of Chesworth originally belonged toi an English family, probably killed at the Battle of Hastings.  It was then taken over by the de Braose family. Edward II apparently stayed at Chesworth in 1324.

After this it was held by the Mowbray and the Howard (later Fitzalan-Howard) families, including the Dukes of Norfolk and the Earls of Arundel. Catherine Howard spent her childhood at Chesworth. Thomas Howard, 4th Duke of Norfolk, was arrested at Chesworth; he was executed for high treason in 1572 after which the Crown took ownership of the estate.

Chesworth House was then occupied by various tenants, including the Bishop of Chichester (1577–82) and the Caryll family (c. 1586–1660). Queen Henrietta Maria lived there from 1660 to 1661 and Catherine of Braganza from 1674 until 1699.

The manor was later owned by the Eversfield family. In 1928 the house was bought by a Captain C. R. Cook who extended it and relaid the moated gardens, incorporating part of the river Arun which runs through the grounds. Subsequent owners included the theatrical agent Laurence Evans and the barrister Eben Hamilton.

In 2012, Chesworth House was put on sale for offers over £7 million. In 2018, the house was again offered for sale at an offer price of £6 million.

References

External links

Grade II* listed buildings in West Sussex
Grade II* listed houses
Manor houses in England
Catherine Howard
Catherine of Braganza
Henrietta Maria